Enchantment of the Seas is a Vision-class cruise ship operated by Royal Caribbean International.

In September 2017, Enchantment of the Seas evacuated the company’s employees and their families from Miami when they had been endangered by Hurricane Irma.

Propellers

The two propellers are highly skewed fixed pitch types, manufactured in Sweden. Enchantment of the Seas and her sister ship Grandeur of the Seas were the first two major cruise ships to be equipped with a Dynamic Positioning System frequently used to maintain position while in port, particularly when tender boats are used.

Refits

In 2005, the Enchantment of the Seas was overhauled. Enchantment of the Seas entered dry dock at Keppel Verolme shipyards in Rotterdam on 15 May 2005. The mid-body extension section was built at Aker Finnyards ahead of time, allowing the construction to be done in just over a month.

The ship resumed service on 7 July 2005, less than two months after entering dry dock. The new section added included 151 new passenger cabins.

In December 2012, Enchantment of the Seas went into drydock in Freeport, Bahamas for a further refurbishment.

Incidents
On 30 September 2009, while Enchantment of the Seas was berthed at Cozumel, Mexico, high winds pushed the cruise ship Carnival Legend against the side resulting in damage to both ships. A Royal Caribbean spokeswoman commented that the ship had minor damage to the stern and some railings. Both ships were able to depart to its next port of call after being inspected by port authorities.

References

Cruise ships of Norway
Ships of Royal Caribbean International
Ships built in Helsinki
1996 ships